José María Jara (1866–1939) was a Mexican painter from Orizaba, Veracruz, whose works were mostly dedicated to capturing Mexican folk customs. He was a noted student of Santiago Rebull, José Salomé Pina and José María Velasco. His best-known work is called El Velorio, which depicts a wake on the floor of a house by a humble family. This painting was presented at the World's Fair in Paris. Other paintings include La Fundación de México, Los aguadores adornando una fuente para la fiesta de la Santa Cruz and Los primeros pasos.

References

19th-century Mexican painters
Mexican male painters
20th-century Mexican painters
1939 deaths
1866 births
People from Orizaba
Artists from Veracruz
19th-century Mexican male artists
20th-century Mexican male artists